David H. Sambar  is a British American Lebanese international investment banker, financial advisor and investor. He is Senior Advisor at UniCredit Banking Group A.G. London; sits on the Board of Directors of several institutions like QIB-UK (alias European Finance House); CAT  Holding Luxembourg (Contracting & Trading)s.

Early life and education 
Dr. Sambar was born in Haifa, Israel. His father was  Consul General for Lebanon at the time. The family moved to Lebanon in 1948 on account of the Jewish-Arab hostilities.

He was educated at British, American and French Schools and Universities; holds a doctorate “cum laude” from Universite de Lyon, France – School of Law, Economics & Business. Tri-lingual: Fluent in English, French, Arabic and conversational in Spanish, Portuguese and Italian. Sambar has lived in Beirut, Paris, London, Geneva and New York.

Career 
Dr. Sambar’s early professional career was in the oil industry (Bechtel/Tapline/Aramco) and soon moved into a financial career with Chase Manhattan Bank, New York (1955). At Chase Manhattan Bank he held various positions in different financial centres, namely, Beirut, Paris, Geneva, London and New York. The last positions were Vice President for The Middle East and North Africa in New York and Executive Director of CML (Chase’s Merchant Bank in London).
David parted with Chase (1977) to take over as head of international operations for the Sharjah Group—a large investment pool owned predominantly by Gulf Ruling/ Royal family members and a substantial number of individual & institutional investors from the Persian Gulf.

His professional life developed into concentrating less on day to day in favour of Board level appointments. He soon was appointed Honorary Chairman of Banque de la Mediterranee, Paris (1983 to 86) and Executive Chairman of Mediterranee Investors Group Luxembourg & UK. Non Exec Chairman of British American Properties. In the same vein he was invited to Kroll Security Group UK as Senior Consultant.

Dr Sambar has non-profit involvements in his capacity as Fellow of The Institute of Directors, UK; Associate of The Security & Defense Forum; Women's World Banking; Freeman of the City of London as well as Trustee & Counselor of a number of international institutions.

In September 2014, Dr Sambar was appointed Senior Advisor to the Executive Board of STOXX Ltd., wholly owned by Deutsche Börse and SMI (Swiss Stock Exchange).

Dr. Sambar is also active on the lecture circuit, frequently delivering papers on financial subjects in front of such bodies as the Council on Foreign Relations, the Stanford Research Institute, and the U.S.-Arab Chamber of Commerce. He is a trustee of the Center for International Business, in Dallas, Texas

Other 
Interviewed, profiled and quoted in:
Washington Report on Middle East Affairs., Forbes, The Wall Street Journal, International Herald Tribune, Houston Chronicle, Euromoney and Business International Corporation.

References 

1939 births
Living people